Agrellite (NaCa2Si4O10F) is a rare triclinic inosilicate mineral with four-periodic single chains of silica tetrahedra.

It is a white to grey translucent mineral, with a pearly luster and white streak. It has a mohs hardness of 5.5 and a specific gravity of 2.8. Its type locality is the Kipawa Alkaline Complex, Quebec, Canada, where it occurs as tabular laths in pegmatite lenses. Other localities include Murmansk Oblast, Russia, Dara-i-Pioz Glacier, Tajikistan, and Saima Complex, Liaoning, China. Common associates at the type locality include Zircon, Eudialyte, Vlasovite, Miserite, Mosandrite-(Ce), and Calcite.

Agrellite displays pink fluorescence strongly under shortwave and weakly under longwave ultraviolet light. The fluorescent activator is dominantly Mn2+, with minor Eu2+, Sm3+, and Dy3+.

It is named in honor of Stuart Olof Agrell (1913–1996), a British mineralogist at Cambridge University.

See also
 List of minerals
 List of minerals named after people

References

Inosilicates
Triclinic minerals
Minerals in space group 2